San Vicente Pacaya is a town and municipality in the Escuintla department of Guatemala.

Climate

San Vicente Pacaya has a subtropical highland climate (Köppen: Cwb).

Geographic location

Films

The municipality was the filming location for the Guatemalan movie Ixcanul, from director Jayro Bustamante, a film that had earn international praise and 17 international awards, including several major European circuits.  Based on a true story, Ixcanul tells the story of María, a young girl that goes from a peaceful arranged married while working at a coffee plantation near Ixcanul Volcano to dealing with the harsh reality of children traffic and machismo in her society after she unwillingly gets pregnant after a night with her childhood sweetheart.

See also

 Pacaya Volcano

Notes and references

References

Municipalities of the Escuintla Department